The 1894–95 Sheffield Shield season was the third season of the Sheffield Shield, the domestic first-class cricket competition of Australia. Victoria won the championship.

Table

Statistics

Most Runs
Syd Gregory 339

Most Wickets
George Giffen 60

References

Sheffield Shield
Sheffield Shield
Sheffield Shield seasons